Nur-Ali Shushtari was a brigadier general in the Iranian Islamic Revolutionary Guard Corps and deputy commander of its Ground Forces. He was assassinated in the 2009 Pishin bombing by the Iranian People's Resistance Movement .

References 

1948 births
2009 deaths
Islamic Revolutionary Guard Corps brigadier generals
People from Nishapur
Islamic Revolutionary Guard Corps personnel of the Iran–Iraq War